Egon Edvin Roland Svensson (17 November 1913 – 12 June 1995) was a bantamweight Greco-Roman wrestler from Sweden. He won silver medals at the 1936 Summer Olympics and 1937 and 1938 European Championships. His son Roland competed in the same event at the 1968 Olympics.

References

External links
 

1913 births
1995 deaths
Olympic wrestlers of Sweden
Wrestlers at the 1936 Summer Olympics
Swedish male sport wrestlers
Olympic silver medalists for Sweden
Olympic medalists in wrestling
Medalists at the 1936 Summer Olympics
Sportspeople from Malmö
20th-century Swedish people